The Dangerous Little Demon is a 1922 American silent comedy film directed by Clarence G. Badger and written by Doris Schroeder. The film stars Marie Prevost, Jack Perrin, Robert Ellis, Bertram Anderson-Smith, Fontaine La Rue, and Edward Martindel. The film was released on March 27, 1922, by the Universal Film Manufacturing Company.

Cast          
Marie Prevost as Teddy Harmon
Jack Perrin as Kenneth Graham
Robert Ellis as Gary McVeigh
Bertram Anderson-Smith as Demy Baker 
Fontaine La Rue as Helene Westley
Edward Martindel as Harmon
Lydia Knott as Aunt Sophia
Herbert Prior as Jay Howard

References

External links

1922 films
1920s English-language films
Silent American comedy films
Universal Pictures films
Films directed by Clarence G. Badger
American silent feature films
American black-and-white films
1922 comedy films
1920s American films